The 41st Annual Tony Awards was held on June 7, 1987, at the Mark Hellinger Theatre and broadcast by CBS television. Angela Lansbury was the host for the third time (she was the host in 1968, 1971, and 1987, and also in 1988 and 1989). This broadcast was awarded the 1987 Primetime Emmy Award for Outstanding Variety, Music or Comedy Series.

Ceremony
Presenters and performers: Jane Alexander, Bea Arthur, Richard Chamberlain, Glenn Close, Charles "Honi" Coles, Barbara Cook, Hume Cronyn, Bob Fosse, Mark Hamill, Helen Hayes, William Hurt, Bill Irwin, Judy Kuhn, Swoosie Kurtz, Dick Latessa, John Lithgow, Mary Martin, Walter Matthau, Andrea McArdle, Mary Tyler Moore, Bernadette Peters, Lynn Redgrave, Chita Rivera, George Rose, Jessica Tandy, Tommy Tune and Kathleen Turner.

Musicals and plays presented:

 Broadway Bound—scene with Linda Lavin and Jonathan Silverman;
 Coastal Disturbances—scene with Annette Bening and Timothy Daly;
 Fences—scene with James Earl Jones and Courtney B. Vance;
 Les Liaisons Dangereuses—scene with Lindsay Duncan and Alan Rickman;
 Rags -- "Rags" - Judy Kuhn and Dick Latessa;
 Les Misérables -- "At the End of the Day"/"One Day More" - Company;
 Me and My Girl -- "The Lambeth Walk" - Robert Lindsay and Company;
 Starlight Express -- "Starlight Express"/"Light at the End of the Tunnel" - Greg Mowry, Steve Fowler and Company;

Special performances and tributes included the song "Bosom Buddies" from Mame, performed by original cast-mates Angela Lansbury and Bea Arthur. There was a special salute to Robert Preston, who died in March 1987. Bernadette Peters sang "Time Heals Everything" from Mack and Mabel, Barbara Cook sang "Till There Was You" from The Music Man, and Mary Martin sang "This House" from I Do! I Do!. Finally, a tribute to George Abbott was introduced by Helen Hayes, with songs from Flora the Red Menace, A Funny Thing Happened on the Way to the Forum, The Boys from Syracuse, Damn Yankees, Where's Charley?, and The Pajama Game.

Winners and nominees
Winners are in bold

Special awards
Regional Theatre Award - San Francisco Mime Troupe
George Abbott, on the occasion of his 100th birthday
Jackie Mason, for The World According to Me
Lawrence Langner Award Winner (Lifetime Achievement in Theatre) - Robert Preston (posthumously)

Multiple nominations and awards

These productions had multiple nominations:

13 nominations: Me and My Girl 
12 nominations: Les Misérables
7 nominations: Les Liaisons Dangereuses and Starlight Express
6 nominations: Fences 
5 nominations: Rags
4 nominations: Broadway Bound 
3 nominations: All My Sons and Coastal Disturbances 
2 nominations: The Front Page, The Mikado, Oh, Coward! and Pygmalion 

The following productions received multiple awards.

8 wins: Les Misérables  
4 wins: Fences 
3 wins: Me and My Girl
2 wins: Broadway Bound

See also
 Drama Desk Awards
 1987 Laurence Olivier Awards – equivalent awards for West End theatre productions
 Obie Award
 New York Drama Critics' Circle
 Theatre World Award
 Lucille Lortel Awards

References

External links
Official site Tony Awards

Tony Awards ceremonies
1987 in theatre
1987 theatre awards
Tony
Primetime Emmy Award for Outstanding Variety Series winners
Tony